Yeon, also spelled Yon, or Yun is a single-syllable Korean given name, and an element in two-syllable Korean given names. Its meaning differs based on the hanja used to write it. There are 56 hanja with the reading "yeon" on the South Korean government's official list of hanja which may be registered for use in given names.

As a name element

First syllable
Yeon-hee
Yeon-seok
Yeon-woo
Yeon-ah
Yeon-jun

Second syllable
Bo-yeon
Chae-yeon
Do-yeon
Ji-yeon, 7th place in 1980.
Mi-yeon
Se-yeon
Seo-yeon, 1st place in 2008, 2009, 2011, 2013. 2nd place in 2015. 3rd place in 2017.
Seung-yeon
Si-yeon
So-yeon
Soo-yeon
Tae-yeon
 Na-yeon

See also
List of Korean given names

References

Korean given names